Pterostylis reflexa, commonly known as the dainty greenhood, is a species of orchid endemic to New South Wales. As with similar greenhoods, the flowering plants differ from those which are not flowering. The non-flowering plants have a rosette of leaves flat on the ground but the flowering plants have a single flower with leaves on the flowering stem. This greenhood has a relatively large white, green and light brown flower with a long, curved dorsal sepal and a protruding labellum.

Description
Pterostylis reflexa is a terrestrial, perennial, deciduous, herb with an underground tuber and when not flowering, a rosette of between three and seven egg-shaped leaves lying flat on the ground. The flowers are white, green and light brown. There is a curved, V-shaped sinus between their bases. Flowering occurs from March to June.

Taxonomy and naming
Pterostylis reflexa was first formally described in 1810 by Robert Brown and the description was published in Prodromus Florae Novae Hollandiae et Insulae Van Diemen. The specific epithet (reflexa) is a Latin word meaning "bent or turned back."

Distribution and habitat
The dainty greenhood mainly grows on ridges and slopes in coastal and near-coastal forest between about Taree and Nowra.

References

External links 

reflexa
Endemic orchids of Australia
Orchids of New South Wales
Plants described in 1810